The Skeleton Dance is a 1929 Silly Symphony animated short subject produced and directed by Walt Disney and animated by Ub Iwerks. In the film, four human skeletons dance and make music around a spooky graveyard—a modern film example of medieval European "danse macabre" imagery.  It is the first entry in the Silly Symphony series.

Summary 
The short film begins when an owl perched on a branch, in front of the full moon, inflates and deflates when the wind blows. A branch appears from the owl's right and turns into a sinister hand and tries to touch it, which frightens the owl. Subsequently, the short film shows a church in the background. In front of it, there is a trunk with several branches, which are moved by the wind. The minute hand on the church's clock strikes twelve, causing its bell to start tolling, which causes a group of bats to flee from the belfry.  The last two bats fly towards the screen before a spider drops down from the tree and crawls right, going offscreen.

The silhouette of a dog inflates and deflates with a howl at the moon, while two cats fight over a grave. The fight ends when a skeleton emerges from the grave. This terrifies the cats, causing them to flee. The skeleton walks, runs and jumps until it hears the sound of the owl. This terrifies it, so it hides behind a grave. The skeleton throws its head at the owl, knocking the owl's feathers off. Then, the head moves on its own to the grave and returns to its body.  There were four skeletons in the grave. They check that there is no danger. After this, the skeletons emerge from the tomb and start dancing. Then, one of them takes two bones out of one of their partners and plays its spine, vertebrae and head to produce music. Another skeleton dances alone and then plays a cat's tail as if it were a violin. The crowing of a cock scares them. The skeletons rush to hide, but their bodies collide and blend together. The skeletons, now mingled, return to the grave.

Production
The origins for The Skeleton Dance can be traced to mid-1928, when Walt Disney was on his way to New York to arrange a distribution deal for his new Mickey Mouse cartoons and to record the soundtrack for his first sound cartoon, Steamboat Willie. During a stopover in Kansas City, Disney paid a visit to his old acquaintance Carl Stalling, then an organist at the Isis Theatre, to compose scores for his first two Mickey shorts, Plane Crazy and The Gallopin' Gaucho. While there, Stalling proposed to Disney a series of "musical novelty" cartoons combining music and animation, which would become the genesis for the Silly Symphony series, and pitched an idea about skeletons dancing in a graveyard. Stalling would eventually join Disney's studio as staff composer.

Animation on The Skeleton Dance began in January 1929, with Ub Iwerks animating the majority of the film in almost six weeks. The soundtrack was recorded at Pat Powers' Cinephone studio in New York in February 1929, along with that of the Mickey Mouse short The Opry House. The final negative cost $5,485.40.

Reception
Variety (July 17, 1929): "Title tells the story, but not the number of laughs included in this sounded cartoon short. The number is high. Peak is reached when one skeleton plays the spine of another in xylophone fashion, using a pair of thigh bones as hammers. Perfectly timed xylo accompaniment completes the effect. The skeletons hoof and frolic. One throws his skull at a hooting owl and knocks the latter's feathers off. Four bones brothers do a unison routine that's a howl. To set the finish, a rooster crows at the dawn. The skeletons, through for the night, dive into a nearby grave, pulling the lid down after them. Along comes a pair of feet, somehow left behind. They kick on the slab and a bony arm reaches out to pull them in. All takes place in a graveyard. Don't bring your children."

The Film Daily (July 21, 1929): "Here is one of the most novel cartoon subjects ever shown on a screen. Here we have a bunch of skeletons knocking out the laughs on their own bones, and how. They do a xylophone number with one playing the tune on the others spine. All takes place in a graveyard, and it is a howl from start to finish, with an owl and a rooster brought in for atmosphere."

In 1994, The Skeleton Dance was voted #18 of the 50 Greatest Cartoons of all time by members of the animation field.

Release
In order to attract a national distributor for the Silly Symphony series, Walt and Roy Disney arranged for The Skeleton Dance to run at the Carthay Circle Theatre in Los Angeles and at the Fox Theatre in San Francisco in June 1929, while Pat Powers arranged for it to play at New York's Roxy Theatre from July. In early August, Columbia Pictures agreed to distribute the Silly Symphonies, and The Skeleton Dance played as a Columbia release in September at the Roxy, making it the first picture in the theater's history have a return engagement.

In March 1931, The New York Times reported that the film had been banned in Denmark for being "too macabre".

Home media
The short was released on December 4, 2001, on Walt Disney Treasures: Silly Symphonies - The Historic Musical Animated Classics and on December 2, 2002, on Walt Disney Treasures: Mickey Mouse in Black and White

Video game
It appears in the video game Epic Mickey 2: The Power of Two as an unlockable short.

References

External links 
 
 
 
 
 
 

1929 films
1929 short films
1929 animated films
1920s Disney animated short films
American black-and-white films
Silly Symphonies
Films set in cemeteries
Dance animation
Films scored by Carl Stalling
Films directed by Walt Disney
Films produced by Walt Disney
Columbia Pictures short films
Columbia Pictures animated short films
American dance films
Animated films without speech
1920s dance films
Fiction about skeletons
Viral videos
1920s English-language films
1920s American films